Shartegodon is an extinct genus of tritylodontid cynodont from late Jurassic Ulan Malgait Formation of Mongolia. The type species, Shartegodon altai, was named in 2017.

References

Prehistoric cynodont genera
Tritylodontids
Fossil taxa described in 2017